Tonga Broadcasting Commission (TBC) is the first and largest broadcasting station in Tonga, solely owned by the government of Tonga. It operates two free-to-air TV channels (Television Tonga and Television Tonga 2), one AM commercial radio channel (Radio Tonga), one FM commercial radio channel (Kool 90FM), and a 24-hour Radio Australia relay channel (FM103). TBC relies on profits from its TV & radio advertising sales, and from its retail radio shop outlet located in Vava'u. Its retail radio shop in Nukualofa's Central Business District was among the numerous businesses destroyed in the riots of 16 November 2006.

Mass media in Tonga
Television stations in Tonga
Radio stations in Tonga
1961 establishments in Tonga